Lament is the fifth studio album by American post-hardcore band Touché Amoré. The album was released on October 9, 2020 through Epitaph Records. Recording sessions took place at the Bunker Studio in Brooklyn featuring Andy Hull's additional vocals recorded at Favorite Gentlemen Studios in Alpharetta, Georgia. It is their first album to be produced by Ross Robinson.

On October 1, 2021 the band released Lament (Demos), an album of demos of songs that would appear on Lament, as well as an unreleased song Persist.

Critical reception

Lament was met with universal acclaim from music critics. At Metacritic, which assigns a normalized rating out of 100 to reviews from mainstream publications, the album received an average score of 83 based on nine reviews. The aggregator AnyDecentMusic? has the critical consensus of the album at a 8.1 out of 10, based on fourteen reviews. The aggregator Album of the Year assessed the critical consensus as 78 out of 100, based on fifteen reviews.

Accolades

Track listing

Personnel
Touché Amoré
 Jeremy Bolm – vocals
 Clayton Stevens – acoustic guitar, 12-string guitar
 Nick Steinhardt – pedal steel guitar, lap steel guitar, 12-string acoustic guitar, art direction, design
 Elliot Babin – drums, keyboards, piano
 Tyler Kirby – bass, additional guitar

Guest musicians
 Justice Tripp – backing vocals (track 1)
 Julien Baker – backing vocals (track 4)
 John Andrew Hull – additional vocals (track 5)
 Ross Robinson – keyboards (tracks: 2, 6, 9), producer, additional engineering
 Jason Schimmel – keyboards (tracks: 3, 7), piano (tracks: 5, 8), additional engineering

Technical
 Mike Balboa – engineering
 Steve Evetts – mixing
 Robert McDowell – additional recording (track 5)
 Alan Douches – mastering
 George L Clarke – photography

Management
 Alex Merchant – management
 Blaze James – management
 Paul Sommerstein – legal
 Josh Javor – booking
 Merrick Jarmulowicz – booking
 Steve Strange – booking

Charts

References

External links

2020 albums
Touché Amoré albums
Epitaph Records albums
Albums produced by Ross Robinson